Hayes Township is a civil township of Charlevoix County in the U.S. state of Michigan. The population was 1,919 at the 2010 census.

Communities
The community also extends east into Resort Township in Emmet County.
It began as a sawmill settlement in 1877 and was named after mill owner E. H. Burgess. A post office operated in Burgess from February 28, 1877 until July 14, 1904. 
It was given a railroad station along the Grand Rapids and Indiana Railroad, and a post office opened on April 3, 1873. The post office operated only briefly until closing on October 27, 1875. 
Success is a former settlement within the township that existed with a rural post office that opened on June 3, 1913 and operated very briefly.
Undine is a former settlement that existed along the northern shores of Pine Lake (now Lake Charlevoix).  It began as a lumber settlement and received a post office on January 15, 1880 with farmer Charles Whitford serving as the first postmaster.  The name may have derived from the Undine, which are mythological humans associated with water.  The post office operated until March 16, 1896.

Geography

Hayes Township is located along the shore of Lake Michigan on the south side of the entrance to Little Traverse Bay. The township extends to Lake Charlevoix on its southern border.  Big Rock Point Nuclear Power Plant was located within the township.

Major highways
  runs along the northern portion of the township near Lake Michigan.
  is a county-designated highway that runs the length of the southern portion of the township near Lake Charlevoix.

Demographics
As of the census of 2000, there were 1,893 people, 767 households, and 578 families residing in the township. The racial makeup of the township was 95.88% White, 0.05% African American, 2.06% Native American, 0.53% Asian, 0.05% Pacific Islander, 0.21% from other races, and 1.22% from two or more races. Hispanic or Latino of any race were 0.26% of the population.

There were 767 households, out of which 30.5% had children under the age of 18 living with them, 65.4% were married couples living together, 6.0% had a female householder with no husband present, and 24.6% were non-families. 19.2% of all households were made up of individuals, and 6.8% had someone living alone who was 65 years of age or older.  The average household size was 2.47 and the average family size was 2.81.

In the township the population was spread out, with 23.3% under the age of 18, 4.5% from 18 to 24, 27.4% from 25 to 44, 30.9% from 45 to 64, and 13.8% who were 65 years of age or older.  The median age was 42 years. For every 100 females, there were 99.7 males.  For every 100 females age 18 and over, there were 98.2 males.

The median income for a household in the township was $50,478, and the median income for a family was $54,911. Males had a median income of $35,694 versus $26,324 for females. The per capita income for the township was $25,512.  About 5.3% of families and 6.2% of the population were below the poverty line, including 10.8% of those under age 18 and 2.4% of those age 65 or over.

Education
Hayes Township is served by three separate school districts.  The vast majority of the township is served by Charlevoix Public Schools to the west in the city of Charlevoix.  The southeast corner of the township is served by Boyne City Public Schools to the southeast in the city of Boyne City.  The northeast corner of the township, including most of the CDP of Bay Shore, is served by the Public Schools of Petoskey to the northeast in the city of Petoskey.

References

Sources

External links
Hayes Township official website

Townships in Charlevoix County, Michigan
Townships in Michigan
Michigan populated places on Lake Michigan